Rani Village or Rani is a small village located in the Sille-Oyan circle of East Siang district, Arunachal Pradesh with a total of 924 residing families. It is situated 12 km from the district headquarter Pasighat and the 3rd largest village in the East Siang district, after Riga Village and Mirem Village.

History
The name Rani is assumed to be derived from an archaeological site at Gomsi, where there might have resided a "Rani" (queen) during the medieval period (Probably of the Chutiya Kingdom). The site was excavated from an cultivation field of Rani Village. As per the Archaeological Survey of India it is assumed that the Rani of the Chutiya kingdom was residing there.

Climate

Geographical location
It is located 12 km from Pasighat and 20 km from Ruksin.

See also
 Bilat
 Ruksin
 Sika Tode

References

Further reading
 

Villages in East Siang district